Harry Bennett (22 June 1859 – 4 October 1898) was an Australian cricketer. He played for Western Australia between 1892 and 1893.

References

External links

1859 births
1898 deaths
Australian cricketers
Western Australia cricketers
Cricketers from Melbourne
Wicket-keepers
People from South Yarra, Victoria